The Canberra Bushrangers were originally created as the Melbourne Bushrangers, To replace the Melbourne Monarchs in the 1991-92 Australian Baseball League Championship after the Monarchs were expelled from the competition.

The Bushrangers were based in Melbourne at the Melbourne Ballpark as well as playing a few games in Ballarat until they relocated to Canberra for the 1993-94 championship, the season after the Monarchs had been reformed. The Bushrangers played for a further two seasons in Canberra at Bruce Stadium until they folded due to heavy financial losses after the 1994-95 championship.

See also 
Sport in Australia
Australian Baseball
Australian Baseball League (1989-1999)

References

External links
The Australian Baseball League: 1989-1999

Australian Baseball League (1989–1999) teams
Defunct baseball teams in Australia
Bus